Piode (Piedmontese: Piòvi) is a comune (municipality) and village of Valsesia in the Province of Vercelli in the Italian region Piedmont, located about  northeast of Turin and about  northwest of Vercelli.

The name "Piode" refers to the many local quarries for the extraction of the stone slabs known as piodi, which are traditionally used to clad the roofs of Alpine houses and baite.

Piode borders the following municipalities: Campertogno, Pettinengo, Pila, Rassa, and Scopello.

Demographic evolution

Notes

References
Piode from www.valsesia.it

Cities and towns in Piedmont